Alexander High School may refer to:

 Alexander High School (Mississippi), Oktibbeha County, Mississippi; closed 1970
 Alexander High School (North Dakota), Alexander, North Dakota, a high school in North Dakota
 Alexander High School (Ohio), Albany, Ohio
 Robert S. Alexander High School, Douglasville, Georgia
 John B. Alexander High School, Laredo, Texas